The Highland Family is an early 19th century painting by British artist David Wilkie. Done in oil on wood, the painting is in the collection of the Metropolitan Museum of Art.

References 

1824 paintings
Paintings in the collection of the Metropolitan Museum of Art